Pietro Sorri (1558-1622) was an Italian painter active in Siena.

Biography
He first studied under Arcangelo Salimbeni (father of Ventura), and afterwards under Cavaliere Domenico Passignano, whom he accompanied to Venice. Several of his works are in Florence and other cities of Tuscany, particularly at Pisa; he painted landscapes and portraits as well as history. Among his pupils were Giovanni Stefano Rossi, Bernardo Strozzi, and Astolfo Petrozzi. He was also active in Lucca, Genoa, Milan, and Pavia.

He painted an altarpiece for the church of San Ambrogio in Massa di Carrara.

Works
Death of Saint Anthony the Abbot (around 1602), Louvrem, Paris
Trinity and Saints, altarpiece at the Sant'Agostine (St. Augustine) church, Siena
Gesù benedicente, la Vergine e i Santi Francesco e Andrea (signed and dated in 1605), Saint Francis Basilica, Siena
Frescoes at the Certosa di Pavia with Alessandro Casolani
Portrait of an Artist, Uffizi Gallery, Florence

References
    

1558 births
1622 deaths
16th-century Italian painters
Italian male painters
17th-century Italian painters
Painters from Siena
People from Castelnuovo Berardenga